Demirchyan or Demirchian or Demirjian (Western Armenian Տէմիրճեան) is an Armenian surname. Notable people with the surname include:

Demirchyan
Derenik Demirchian (1877–1956), Georgian-born Armenian poet, writer, translator and playwright
Hovhannes Demirchyan (born 1975), Armenian footballer
Karen Demirchyan (1932–1999), Soviet Armenian communist politician
Stepan Demirchyan (born 1959), Armenian politician

Demirjian
Eddie Demirjian, Lebanese Armenian politician
Hovig Demirjian (born 1989), Cypriot Armenian singer, also known by the mononym Hovig 
Karoun Demirjian (born 1981), American Armenian multimedia international journalist and freelance reporter

Armenian-language surnames